Barsali is a village located in Betul tehsil, in Betul district of Madhya Pradesh, India. It is the location of the geographical centre of India.

References

Villages in Betul district
Geographical centres